This is a list of slums in India.

List

Delhi
Munirka, Delhi
Kathputhli Colony
Talkatora

Kolkata
Pilkhana
Tikiapara
Basanti

Mumbai

Dharavi
Banganga
Baiganwadi
Antop Hill

Chennai
Vyasarpadi
Royapuram
Thiruvotriyur

Bhubaneswar
Salia Sahi,

Guwahati
Chandmari

Others

Prem Sagar

See also

Mahila Milan
Slum Jagathu
Poverty in India

Housing
Housing in India
Illegal housing in India
Pavement dwellers
Street children in India

International:
 List of slums

References

Slums
India

Slums